Gentile Point is a rounded, ice-covered point  north of Cape Parr, extending seaward from the Darley Hills on the west side of the Ross Ice Shelf. It was named by the Advisory Committee on Antarctic Names for Peter A. Gentile, Master of USNS Alatna in U.S. Navy Operation Deep Freeze 1961, and of USNS Chattahoochee which made four fuel-carrying trips between New Zealand and McMurdo Sound in Operation Deep Freeze 1963.

References

Headlands of the Ross Dependency
Shackleton Coast